Acacia ancistrophylla is a shrub of the genus Acacia and the subgenus Plurinerves that is native to several areas on southern Australia.

Description
It has glabrous or sparsely haired branchlets. Like most species of Acacia it has phyllodes rather than true leaves. The glabrous leathery and evergreen phyllodes are patent to erect with a narrowly oblong oblanceolate, linear or linear-oblanceolate shape and are straight to slightly curved. It blooms from August to October and produces yellow flowers.

Taxonomy
The species was first described in 1904 by the botanist Cecil Andrews.

There are three recognised varieties:
 Acacia ancistrophylla var. ancistrophylla
 Acacia ancistrophylla var. lissophylla
 Acacia ancistrophylla var. perarcuata

Distribution
It has a scattered distribution through southern Western AustraliaW, south-eastern parts of South Australia and north-western Victoria. In Western Australia it is found in the Wheatbelt and Goldfields-Esperance regions and is commonly situated on hills, plains, and ridges growing in clay, sandy or loamy soils often over or around limestone.

See also
 List of Acacia species

References

ancistrophylla
Acacias of Western Australia
Plants described in 1904
Flora of South Australia
Taxa named by Cecil Rollo Payton Andrews